"Ay Yo" is a song by Canadian R&B singer Melanie Fiona from her debut album, The Bridge (2009). The song was written by Andrea Martin, Allen Toussaint, Darren Lewis, Iyiola Babalola, Melanie Hallim, and was produced by Future Cut.

Music video
A music video to accompany the release of "Ay Yo" was first released onto YouTube on 7 April 2010 at a total length of three minutes and fifty-four seconds.

Track listing

Chart performance

References

Songs written by Allen Toussaint
Songs written by Andrea Martin (musician)
Songs written by Iyiola Babalola
2010 singles
2010 songs